Malaysia competed in the 2008 Summer Olympics, held in Beijing, People's Republic of China. Malaysia had 32 athletes who took part in ten sports in the games. Lee Chong Wei won the nation's first medal in twelve years in the badminton men's singles final despite losing to Lin Dan, from the host country China. It was the second silver medal ever won throughout Malaysia's participation history since its nationhood in 1957. Hockey legend Dato Ho Koh Chye was the chef-de-mission of the delegation.

Medalists

Archery

Malaysia will send archers to the Olympics for the second time, seeking the nation's first Olympic medal in the sport. Only men qualified for Malaysia, with Cheng Chu Sian and Muhammad Marbawi Sulaiman earning spots for the country by placing 8th and 27th, respectively, at the 2007 World Outdoor Target Championships and Wan Khalmizam Wan Abd Aziz adding a third spot with his third-place finish at the Asian championships.

Athletics

Men

Women
Track & road events

Field events

Badminton

Men

Women

Cycling

Track
Sprint

Keirin

Diving

Men

Women

Sailing

Men

M = Medal race; EL = Eliminated – did not advance into the medal race; CAN = Race cancelled

Shooting

Men

Swimming

Men

Women

Taekwondo

Weightlifting

See also
 Malaysia at the 2008 Summer Paralympics

References

Nations at the 2008 Summer Olympics
2008
Summer Olympics